Cerithiopsis prieguei is a species of sea snail, a gastropod in the family Cerithiopsidae, which is known from the Caribbean Sea and the Gulf of Mexico. It was described by Rolán and Espinosa, in 1996.

Description 
The maximum recorded shell length is 2.5 mm.

Habitat 
Minimum recorded depth is 2 m. Maximum recorded depth is 71 m.

References

prieguei
Gastropods described in 1996